The Strange is a science fantasy tabletop role-playing game, written by Bruce Cordell & Monte Cook, and published by Monte Cook Games.

History 
The Strange was published in 2014 by Monte Cook Games, as a result of a crowd funding campaign in 2013. The campaign raised $418,478 from 2,883 backers.

Game

Setting 
The Strange is set in modern-day Earth but allows a GM to take their stories through many different "recursions", worlds based frequently on literary creations.

Character creation 

Character creation has been simplified by having players fill in the blanks to the statement: 
"I am a __ __ who _s."
 The first blank, the adjective in the sentence, is filled in by a character's "Descriptor", a way to describe the character's strongest characteristic.
 The second blank, the noun of the sentence, is filled in by a character's "Type", which is either a "Vector", a "Paradox", or a "Spinner".
 The third blank, the verb of the sentence, is filled in by a character's "Focus", or what the character is most known for or their special talent.

Game mechanics 
The Strange uses the Cypher System, developed for Numenera and is played primarily using a d20, but is used to determine if the player has beaten the difficulty of the task. The GM sets the initial difficulty and will relay that to the player prior to the roll to help them determine their course of action. A player uses their training and/or may apply "effort" to lower the level of difficulty prior to the roll, rather than heavily augmenting the result of the roll to beat a target.

Products

Reception
The Strange won the 2015 Silver Ennie Award for "Best Interior Art", "Best Game", and "Best Setting".

References

External links 
The Strange at RPGeek
The Strange (Official Site)

ENnies winners
Fantasy role-playing games
Role-playing games introduced in 2014
Science fantasy role-playing games
Science fiction role-playing games